Vijayan ministry may refer to:

First Vijayan ministry, the Kerala government headed by Pinarayi Vijayan from 2016 to 2021
Second Vijayan  ministry, the Kerala government headed by Pinarayi Vijayan from 2021 onwards

See also
 Pinarayi Vijayan